Scout's Safari is an American teen comedy-drama television series that aired on Discovery Kids and Saturday mornings on NBC. The series was created by Thomas W. Lynch (The Secret World of Alex Mack, Caitlin's Way).

Premise
The show revolves around Jennifer "Scout" Lauer, a teenage girl who lives the simple life in New York City until her photographer father is sent on year-round trip around the world and she is forced to live with her know-it-all mother (Cheryl) and her new husband (Roger) at a resort in South Africa. While she is there she is exposed to a new world, goes to a new school, and reunites with her other best friend named Bongani, who believes strongly in his Zulu culture, lives with his Uncle C.B., a veterinarian. Bongani is often the voice of reason for Scout. While still keeping in contact with her best friend Sherna via webcam, she has to deal with her stepdad's bratty and Know-it-All young son Tyler. During the course of the series Scout eventually becomes more comfortable in her new surroundings.

Cast

Main
 Anastasia Baranova as Jennifer "Scout" Lauer
 Freedom Hadebe as Bongani
 Jarred Uys as Tyler Shickler
 Chantell Stander as Cheryl Lauer-Shickler
 Ashley Dowds as Roger Shickler
 Hlomla Dandala as Carlton "C.B." Boone

Supporting
 Dana de Agrella as Sherna Puckett
 Ma Afrika Kekana as Nandi Ngwenyo
 Roxanne Burger as Sophie Turner

Episodes

Season 1 (2002–03)

Season 2 (2003–04)

External links
 

2000s American comedy-drama television series
2000s American teen drama television series
2000s American teen sitcoms
2002 American television series debuts
2004 American television series endings
American educational television series
English-language television shows
Discovery Kids original programming
Television series about teenagers
Television shows set in South Africa